The smallspotted dart (Trachinotus baillonii) is an Indo-Pacific species of pompano in the family Carangidae.

Description
The body color varies from silvery blue to grey above, with some small black spots on the flanks. The number of these spots increases with age. This fish is silvery white below. It has large, strong fins, a forked tail, and a narrow base. It feeds on small fishes.

Distribution and habitat

This species is widespread in the Indo-Pacific, from the Red Sea and coast of East Africa to the Gambier Islands and southern Japan. In the Marquesas Islands, it is replaced by the similar Marquesas dart (T. macrospilus). The smallspotted dart is a reef-associated species. It can be found in lagoons and seaward reefs, usually in schools near the surface of waters.

Species description and etymology
Trachinotus baillonii was formally described in 1801 by the French naturalist Bernard Germain de Lacépède (1726-1825) as Caesiomorus bailloni, the name having been written in a manuscript by Philibert Commerson but was not formally published. The identity of the person nonoured in the specific name is not clear but is either the French naturalist Louis Antoine François Baillon (1778-1851), or his father Jean François Emmanuel Baillon (1742-1801), who was also a naturalist.

References

 Eschmeyer, William N., ed. 1998. Catalog of Fishes. Special Publication of the Center for Biodiversity Research and Information, n. 1, vol. 1-3. California Academy of Sciences. San Francisco, California, United States. 2905. .
 Fenner, Robert M.: The Conscientious Marine Aquarist. Neptune City, New Jersey, United States : T.F.H. Publications, 2001.
 Helfman, G., B. Collette y D. Facey: The diversity of fishes. Blackwell Science, Malden, Massachusetts, United States, 1997.
 Hoese, D.F. 1986: . A M.M. Smith y P.C. Heemstra (eds.) Smiths' sea fishes. Springer-Verlag, Berlín, Germany.
 Maugé, L.A. 1986.  A J. Daget, J.-P. Gosse y D.F.E. Thys van den Audenaerde (eds.) Check-list of the freshwater fishes of Africa (CLOFFA). ISNB Brussels; MRAC; y ORSTOM, Paris, France. Vol. 2.
 Moyle, P. y J. Cech.: Fishes: An Introduction to Ichthyology, 4th. ed., Upper Saddle River, New Jersey, United States: Prentice-Hall. 2000.
 Nelson, J.: Fishes of the World, 3rd. Ed. New York City, United States: John Wiley and Sons. 1994.
 Wheeler, A.: The World Encyclopedia of Fishes, 2nd. Ed., London: Macdonald. 1985.

smallspotted dart
Fish of the Pacific Ocean
Taxa named by Bernard Germain de Lacépède
smallspotted dart